This is a list of people elected Fellow of the Royal Society in 2012.

Fellows 

 Varinder Kumar Aggarwal
 John Aggleton
 Shankar Balasubramanian
 Philip Nigel Bartlett
 Alan Bundy
 Jeremy Burroughes
 Gordon Dougan
 Michele Dougherty
 Christopher Dye
 Garret FitzGerald
 Patrick William Fowler
 Hermann Hauser
 Alasdair Iain Houston
 Christopher Michael Hull
 Steve Jones
 Dominic David Joyce
 Richard Kerswell
 Chandrashekhar Khare
 David Klenerman
 Tony Kouzarides
 Russell Lande
 Julian Hart Lewis
 Eddy Liew
 Ian Calman Muir MacLennan
 David MacMillan
 Trevor John McDougall
 John Michael McNamara
 Andrew John McWalter Millar
 David Owen Morgan
 Hugh O'Neill
 Michael Petrides
 Margaret Robinson
 Brian Schmidt
 Chris D. Thomas
 Hywel Rhys Thomas
 Mathukumalli Vidyasagar
 Krishnaswamy VijayRaghavan
 Tejinder Virdee
 Gabriel Waksman
 Ian Walmsley
 Mark Warner
 Timothy John Williams
 Stephen Withers
 Daniel Wolpert

Foreign members 

 Bonnie Bassler
Ralph J. Cicerone
 Avelino Corma Canos
 Jack E. Dixon
 Denis Duboule
 Paul R. Ehrlich
 Zhou Guangzhao
 Reinhard Genzel

References 
 royalsociety.org/about-us/fellowship/new-fellows-2012/

2012
2012 in science
2012 in the United Kingdom